Modern Art EP is a limited edition EP by the American alternative rock band Chronic Future. It was released on November 11, 2008 on Amazon.com and iTunes under guitarist Ben Collins' record label, Modern Art Records.

The song "Rocket Science" was the last song written to feature the band's earlier punk/hip hop style, but the song was emulated into the band's new electronica/hip hop/alternative sound.

From left to right, the members of the band featured on the cover are: Ben Collins, Barry Collins, Mike Busse and Brandon Lee.

Track listing

Personnel
Mike Busse – lead vocals, backing vocals
Ben Collins – guitar, backing vocals
Brandon Lee – lead vocals, bass guitar, backing vocals
Barry Collins – drums, percussion

Chronic Future albums